Standings and Results for Group A of the Regular Season phase of the 2007-08 Euroleague basketball tournament.

Main page: Euroleague 2007-08

Standings

Fixtures and results
All times given below are in Central European Time.

Game 1
October 22–25, 2007

Notes:
 The Montepaschi-Olimpija match saw Olimpija's Miha Zupan become the first deaf player ever in the Euroleague.

Game 2
October 31 - November 1, 2007

Game 3
November 7–8, 2007

Game 4
November 14–15, 2007

Game 5
November 21, 2007

Game 6
November 28–29, 2007

Game 7
December 5–6, 2007

Game 8
December 12–13, 2007

Game 9
December 19–20, 2007

Game 10
January 2–3, 2008

Game 11
January 9–10, 2008

Game 12
January 17, 2008

Game 13
January 23–24, 2008

Game 14
January 30, 2008

Notes and references

2007–08 Euroleague